Henry William Pickersgill RA (3 December 1782 – 21 April 1875) was an English painter specialising in portraits. He was a Royal Academician for almost fifty years, and painted many of the most notable figures of his time.

Biography
Born in London, Pickersgill was adopted in his youth by a Mr Hall, a silk manufacturer in Spitalfields, who financed his schooling and then took him into the family business. When war caused difficult trading conditions, Pickersgill opted to develop his talent for painting into a career, and was a pupil of landscape artist George Arnald between 1802–1805 before entering the Royal Academy Schools as a student in November 1805.

 
His early subjects were varied and included landscapes and classical and historical themes, but he eventually settled to portraiture as his speciality. His first exhibit at the Royal Academy was a portrait of his benefactor Mr Hall, and during his lifetime he showed a total of 384 paintings there. He was elected to associate membership of the Academy in November 1822 and full membership in February 1826.

Pickersgill was one of the pre-eminent portrait painters of his day. Robert Peel, William Wordsworth, George Stephenson, Jeremy Bentham, Letitia Elizabeth Landon, Elizabeth Barrett Browning, Lord Nelson, the Duke of Wellington and Faraday were among the many notable people who sat for him. He famously painted author James Silk Buckingham and his wife Elizabeth in Arab costume in 1816, reflecting Buckingham's own travels in the East as well as the fashion of the times for the Orient. The National Portrait Gallery, London has over 50 of his portraits in its collection, including 16 original oils and 35 engravings after him, along with a small number of portraits of Pickersgill himself by others.

From 1856–64, he was librarian of the Royal Academy. He retired from the institution in December 1872, and died at his home in Blandford Square, London, at the age of 93. He is buried in Barnes Cemetery.

Pickersgill's brother Richard, son Henry Hall and nephew Frederick Richard were also painters. His wife Jeanette published a volume of poetry in 1827 entitled Tales of the Harem. After her death in 1885, Mrs Pickersgill became the first person to be legally cremated in the United Kingdom at Woking Crematorium.

In his will Pickersgill left a bequest to the Royal National Lifeboat Institution. The lifeboat Henry William Pickersgill R.A., which served on the Dover station between 1878–88, was funded by this bequest.

Letitia Elizabeth Landon's poem The Oriental Nosegay by Pickersgill in her Poetical Sketches of Modern Pictures (in The Troubadour, 1826) probably refers to his Oriental Love Letter (1824) in the R. A. collection.

See also
 List of Orientalist artists
 Orientalism

References

External links

 
  is a painting of 1828, based on an earlier portrait of Letitia Elizabeth Landon. This engraving was the frontispiece to The Amulet annual for 1830.
 , engraved by Charles Fox for The Amulet annual for 1832, with a poetical illustration by Letitia Elizabeth Landon.

1782 births
1875 deaths
19th-century English painters
English male painters
English portrait painters
English librarians
Orientalist painters
Painters from London
Royal Academicians
19th-century English male artists
Burials at Barnes Cemetery